Michael Heseltine Watt  (born 16 December 1940) is a New Zealand entrepreneur, philanthropist, and investor. He is one of five New Zealanders who were featured in the Sunday Times Rich List 2009. He was appointed an Officer of the New Zealand Order of Merit for services to the community in the 2005 New Year Honours.

Early life 
Born in Christchurch, New Zealand, he was expelled from Christ's College, Christchurch, in 1955 and spent the next 10 years working in various blue-collar industries (including oil drilling, construction, and rigging) around the world, as well as numerous hotels and jazz clubs in the United States.

Oil industry 
In the 1960s Watt worked as an explosives expert for oil exploration crews in North Africa, the Middle East, and Central America. In the late 1960s/early 1970s he worked for the National Supply Company oilfield division of Armco Steel, out of Houston, TX, and Louisiana on the early development of sub-sea wellheads and blow-out preventers. During this period he became a partner of Drexel Oil Services in Aberdeen, Scotland. After a project with the Israeli Government off the Sinai Peninsula, Watt sold out of all his oil interests in 1976.

Sports 
While working with Capital Sports New York, he formed CSI in London and quickly saw an opportunity where sports bodies worldwide were not exploiting their international television rights intelligently, and in a pioneering move soon represented all soccer bodies in UK/Europe, as well as all international rugby and cricket federations. CSI's largest publicised contract was a deal with NewsCorp in the lead up to the 1995 Rugby World Cup in South Africa, which led to the professionalism of the international Rugby Union, particularly in the southern hemisphere. Worth approx. $950m, this was largest sports broadcasting contract in history at the time. CSI represented all cricket and rugby federations, and most soccer federations, for 15 years. Their work is largely credited with shaping the current professionalism of most major sporting industries.

CSI was sold to the Interpublic Group in 2001.

Music 
Watt produced numerous albums since the 1990s, most notably Vince Mendoza's Grammy-nominated Epiphany in 1999, which is considered a classic by many in the jazz music industry including Bill Laurance of Snarky Puppy, John Beasley and The Juilliard School of Music. .

In 2009 Watt joined music mogul Korda Marshall in relaunching the Infectious Music record label (formerly known as Infectious Records). The label's most notable signing was alt-J, who won the 2012 British Barclaycard Mercury Prize for their debut album An Awesome Wave, which reached Platinum certification in the UK. Their other signings include General Fiasco, Local Natives, Cloud Control, Drenge, Superfood, RY X, The Acid, These New Puritans, and Vance Joy. Infectious Music was acquired by BMG Rights Management in September 2014.

Watt is also the owner of the legendary Ronnie Scott's Jazz Club in Soho, London, with business partner Sally Greene OBE.

Theatre 
Watt has had an extensive history in the theatre industry, and is the only New Zealander to receive a Tony Award for his production of Annie Get Your Gun,  and Company. 

His current theatre production credits include:
 Jersey Boys
 The Bodyguard
 Matilda the Musical
 Company
His previous notable theatre production credits include:
 We Will Rock You
 The Boy from Oz
 Gypsy

Philanthropy 
Watt has dedicated much of his later life to philanthropic endeavours around the globe.

Earlier endeavours include sponsoring the Durham Miners' Gala when it was on the brink of collapse in the late 1990s. His UK domestic work also includes supporting the Easington Colliery Band, as well as many other music-based non-profits including The Sixteen, the National Youth Jazz Orchestra, and across the Atlantic the Jazz Foundation of America. By forming the Ronnie Scott's Charitable Foundation in 2015 he is continuing to support major musical charities across the UK and provide free instruments to disadvantaged youths.

His efforts expanded to internationally to include numerous projects in Mozambique, such as agricultural and sustainability developments in the northern village of Chupanga, a school for the blind in Beira, as well as the purchase and conversion of a disused prison on the outskirts of Beira into a women's safe space. He also funded with Concern Worldwide the development of another safe space for women and children in Bangladesh, as well as a state of the art paediatric dental clinic in a refugee camp in Amman, Jordan. In Cuba he has developed schools and community projects, as well as providing Cuban hospitals with much needed supplies.

His love of sports has seen him develop cricket facilities in townships of South Africa, while back in his native New Zealand he funded the development of the Hadlee Watt Academy and the Bert Sutcliffe Oval at Lincoln University in Christchurch, New Zealand.

In recent years his focus has shifted towards the refugee crises in the Middle East and Africa, in particular he has supported projects by Concern Worldwide to: deliver emergency aid kits to thousands of internally displaced person in Northern Syria, provide aid to Syrian refugees in Northern Lebanon, and help Sierra Leone recover after the Ebola crisis. He is also the primary donor for Salam LADC, a grassroots NGO that provides aid to the approx. 500,000 Syrian and Palestinian refugees in the Bekaa Valley of Lebanon.

In 2000, he donated to Brisbane-based Brothers Rugby Club “saving them from collapse”, and subsequently is referred to as ‘club savior’.

In 2003, he made a significant donation to the New Zealand Special Olympics which sponsored the event. He also donated to the Hohepa Trust based in New Zealand, which cares for the intellectually disabled.

He has supported various projects with Jane Goodall over the years.

References

1940 births
Living people
Officers of the New Zealand Order of Merit
New Zealand businesspeople
New Zealand philanthropists